Ivan Pernar may refer to:
Ivan Pernar (politician, born 1889), Croatian politician of the Croatian Peasant Party
Ivan Pernar (politician, born 1985), anti-eviction activist and founder of the Human Shield political party